The economy of the Arab League is the economy of the member states of the Arab League. The economy is primarily dependent on exports of oil and natural gas; in recent years however, tourism has grown rapidly, becoming the fastest growing sector in the region.

The Greater Arab Free Trade Area, founded in 1997, is a pan-Arab free trade area that effectively rendered 95% of all Arab World products free of customs tax.

The economic development in the Arab League exhibits a great diversity. There is a significant difference imbalance in the wealth between the rich oil states of the United Arab Emirates, Qatar, Kuwait and Saudi Arabia, and the developing nations within the League, such as Comoros, Mauritania and Djibouti.

Free trade agreements

GDP and GDP per capita of member states 

Based on latest figures and estimates, the Arab League has a total GDP of approximately $7.1 trillion  at purchasing power parity, or US$2.4 trillion at nominal values. The member state with the highest total GDP is Saudi Arabia at $2.002 trillion (PPP), or 1,040 billion in current US dollars (nominal), followed by Egypt at $1.562 trillion (PPP). Comoros has the lowest GDP at $3.2 billion (PPP), or US$1.3 billion at nominal, followed by Djibouti at $6.7 billion (PPP).

The country with the highest GDP per capita is Qatar, at $114,789 (PPP), IMF PPP per capita or US$84,514 (nominal). Somalia has the lowest, with a nominal GDP per capita of US$5499.96 or $1,299.96 (PPP). Therefore, Qatar's nominal GDP per capita is around 156 times as high as that of Somaliland.

List

.

Notes

References

External links
https://web.archive.org/web/20080506173842/
http://www.amf.org.ae/venglish 
Full text of the Agadir Agreement (English version)
The Agadir Agreement and Open regionalism by Steffen Wippel

Arab League
 
International economic organizations
Trade blocs